Johann Christian Friedrich Schneider (3 January 1786 in Alt-Waltersdorf – 23 November 1853 in Dessau) was a German pianist, composer, organist, and conductor.

Schneider studied piano first with his father Johann Gottlob Schneider (senior), and then at the Zittau Gymnasium with Schönfelder and Unger. His first published works were a set of three piano sonatas in 1804. In 1805, he commenced studies at the University of Leipzig. He became an organist at St. Thomas Church, Leipzig in 1812, and was named conductor in Dessau in 1821. It is thought that Schneider premiered Ludwig van Beethoven's Piano Concerto No. 5 in Leipzig on 28 November 1811. In 1824, he was festival director of the Lower Rhenish Music Festival and his oratorio Die Sündflut was premiered during this event.

Schneider composed copiously. Among his works are seven operas, four masses, six oratorios, 25 cantatas, 23 symphonies, seven piano concertos, sonatas for violin, flute, and cello, and a great many shorter instrumental pieces, some of them for piano, some for organ. He also left numerous solo songs and part songs.

Friedrich Lux was one of Schneider's pupils. His brothers Johann Gottlob Schneider (junior; 1789-1864) and Johann Gottlieb Schneider (1797-1856) were likewise organists, the former achieving great fame and notability, with artistic connections to Mendelssohn, Liszt, Schumann and many others.

Selected recordings
Friedrich Schneider Das Weltgericht Martina Rüping, Marie Henriette Reinhold, Patrick Grahl, GewandhausChor Leipzig, Camerata Lipsiensis, Gregor Meyer 2CD 2019

References

Don Randel, The Harvard Biographical Dictionary of Music. Harvard, 1996, pp. 803–804.

External links

1786 births
1853 deaths
German opera composers
Male opera composers
Composers for piano
German Romantic composers
German conductors (music)
German male conductors (music)
German classical pianists
Male classical pianists
String quartet composers
19th-century classical composers
German male classical composers
19th-century classical pianists
19th-century German composers
Leipzig University alumni
German pianists
German male pianists
19th-century German male musicians